INA-Industrija nafte, d.d. is a Croatian multinational oil company. INA Group has leading role in Croatia's oil business, a strong regional position in the oil and gas exploration and production, oil processing, and oil product distribution activities. INA, d.d. is a stock company with the Hungarian MOL Group and the Croatian Government as its biggest shareholders, while a minority of shares is owned by private and institutional investors. INA shares have been listed at the London and Zagreb stock exchanges since December 1, 2006. INA Group is composed of several affiliated companies wholly or partially owned by INA, d.d.. The Group has its headquarters in Zagreb.

History

INA headquarters in Zagreb
INA was established on January 1, 1964 through the merger of Naftaplin (company for oil and gas exploration and production) with the refineries in Rijeka and Sisak. Initially, the company was called "Oil and Gas Conglomerate" but on 26 November its name was changed to the one it has today. In 1990, INA became a state-owned company and in 1993 a joint stock company. The first stage of privatization, when MOL Company became INA’s strategic partner by purchasing 25% plus one share, was completed in 2003. Seven percent of shares were transferred to the Croatian Defenders’ Fund in 2005. After selling 7% shares to former and current INA employees, ownership structure of the company has changed and now less than 50% of total shares lie in state ownership. In this sense, the Croatian Government and MOL have signed the First Amendments to the Shareholders Agreement. In October 2008, MOL‘s voluntary public takeover offer to INA – INDUSTRIJA NAFTE d.d. shareholders was finalized. MOL has increased its ownership to 47, 16% by transferring shares stored during voluntary public offer and by paying off funds to shareholders. Subsequent doubts over legality of the acquisition in light of the Ivo Sanader corruption case led to the INA-MOL dispute, ultimately resolved in favor of MOL before the United Nations Commission on International Trade Law.

Upstream
Until now, INA has been involved in exploration and production operations in Croatia (Pannonian basin, Adriatic offshore) and 20 foreign countries. Today INA operates its exploration and production activities in Croatia, Egypt and Angola. In exploration and production, as the primary initiator of company’s development, in the future INA plans to follow development strategy based on research, development of existing projects and the potential action of non-organic steps. The Company is focused on 100% reserves replacement and maintenance of production level of approximately 70,000 boe per day.

Downstream
INA has two fuel refineries, located in Rijeka (Urinj) and Sisak. The refinery in Rijeka is located on shore, allowing access to the port for deep-drawing ships and the pipeline system of JANAF. More than HRK 54 billion is invested in the refinery system development in the last few years. In Rijeka refinery three facilities within Hydrocracking complex were built – Mild hydrocracking, Hydrogen unit and Desulphurization plant (Claus) as well as numerous supporting facilities and installations. The facilities are in commercial work from May 2011. In February 2014 a contract on basic design for the Delayed Coking Unit for Rijeka Refinery was signed with the company Bechtel Hydrocarbon Technical Solutions (BHTS).  In Sisak refinery three plants have been completed: desulphurization plant, the so-called Claus the hydrodesulphurization of FCC gasoline plant and Isomerization plant. Furthermore, from mid-2013 Sisak Refinery has the possibility of production of diesel fuels with bio component and in the same year in September a system of additional wastewater treatment KROFTA was put into operation, while in April 2014 the installation of new coke chambers was carried out at the Coking plant.

Retail
INA manages a regional network of 445 petrol stations in Croatia and neighboring countries.

Rijeka refinery 

INA is the operator of Rijeka oil refinery which is located in the region Bakar at the entrance to Bay of Bakar.
 
Rijeka's oil refinery was founded 1883 in the district Mlaka. It began its production with 300 staff members was and with its capacity of 60,000 tons per annum the biggest refinery on the European continent. After World War I Rijeka became part of the Kingdom of Italy and the refinery became an important part of the Italian oil program. 1922 its name was changed to Raffineria di Oli Minerali S.A. From 1926 onwards the refinery was the first industrial enterprise of the Italian Agip. When World War II started the refinery had a capacity of 120000 tons. When the war ended Rijeka belonged to Yugoslavia. The destroyed refinery was rebuilt and was enlarged by another factory in Urinj. Lubricants were produced in Urinj and fuels were produced in Mlaka. By 1965 the refinery had a capacity of 8 million tons per annum.
 
In the 1960s, as part of Rijeka's harbor extension the mineral-oil-port was moved to the bay of Omišalj on the island Krk (JANAF). A 7,2 km long and 20 inches thick pipeline led from there to Rijeka's refinery. The refinery is located 12 km south of the city and comprises an area of 3,5 square km in the districts Kostrena and Bakar. It is reachable via ship, street and railway.

In the 1980s the refinery produced 250 different oil products including the countries first unleaded fuel in 1984.

The refinery has its own port, wharfs and offshore establishments to provide transport of goods, raw oil, petroleum products and petrolium-derivatives. The following products are being produced at the INA-refinery: liquefied petroleum gas, naphtha, Motor fuel, jet fuel, diesel fuel, heating oil, asphalt, coke, sulfur, lubricant, grease and paraffin wax.

Sisak refinery 

INA runs a second refinery in Sisak directly where the river Kupa joins the river Sava. The refinery's history began in 1923 when Royal Dutch Shell established an oil storage. In 1928 Shell extended the storage by building the first refinery system. The refinery had a capacity of 170 tons per day. In 1940 the processing of local raw oil began. The refinery was majorly damaged in World War II. The production continued in September 1945 after the war had ended and reached its prewar production level in 1949. From 1956 to 1964 the production facilities were extended and the refinery's capacity rose to 1 million tons per year. Until the mid-1980s the refinery's capacity continued to grow up to 6.5 million tons per year.

During the Croatian War of Independence from 1991 to 1995 the battlefront was only a few kilometers away from the refinery. Due to this circumstance the production facilities were destroyed. When the refinery was reconstructed at the end of the war it was modernized.

In September 2014 plans were announced that INA wanted to close the refinery in Sisak. However, in October 2014 the INA supervisory board decided to postpone the closure.

Finances
The following table shows the main financial indicators of the INA Group for the period from 2005-2021, based on the yearly financial reports. The exchange rate from Croatian kuna to United States dollar was taken from the official site of the Croatian National Bank. Since the takeover by MOL Group in late 2008, the revenue of the INA Group has been gradually decreasing from a record 5.767 billion USD in 2008 to 3.672 billion in 2021 (36.34% decrease). Two contributing factors were the effects of the Financial crisis of 2007–2008 and the loss of a total of six oil and gas fields in Syria due the Sanctions against Syria imposed by the EU as a response to the Syrian civil war. Close to one billion USD was invested by INA in the Syrian project, which was contributing 780 million USD a year in revenue. In October 2014, fighters of the Islamic State seized two of the six oil and gas fields. According to an interview with Davor Štern in 2021, who was the Minister of Economy, Labour and Entrepreneurship in the Croatian Government and head of the supervisory board of INA at the time, there is currently no interest by the MOL Group to initialize a return of INA to its Syrian oil and gas fields.

The following table shows the main financial indicators of only INA d.d. for the period from 2005-2021, based on the yearly financial reports.

See also

Hetem Ramadani

References

External links

 

Companies listed on the Zagreb Stock Exchange
Non-renewable resource companies established in 1964
Oil and gas companies of Croatia
1964 establishments in Croatia
Companies based in Zagreb
Government-owned companies of Croatia